Double Dhamaal (also known as Dhamaal 2: 420s) is a 2011 Indian Hindi-language comedy film and a sequel to the 2007 hit film Dhamaal, and the second installment of Dhamaal film series. The film is directed and produced by Indra Kumar and also produced by Ashok Thakeria.

Sanjay Dutt, Ritesh Deshmukh, Arshad Warsi, Aashish Chaudhary and Javed Jaffrey reprise their roles from the previous films, with Kangana Ranaut and Mallika Sherawat as new additions. The theatrical trailer of the film was revealed on 6 May 2011 along with the film Haunted. The film released on 24 June 2011.

Upon release, the film received mixed reviews from critics, with praise for the performances but criticism for it humor and clichés. Despite this, it was a commercial hit at the box office.

A sequel titled Total Dhamaal was released in February 2019, with the main three cast members (Deshmukh, Warsi, and Jaffrey) reprising their roles.

Plot
The story continues from the previous film.

The four good-for-nothing friends Roy (Ritesh Deshmukh), Adi (Arshad Warsi), Boman (Aashish Chaudhary) and Manav (Javed Jaffrey) are still trying to con people for a living. They happen to see their old enemy Kabir (Sanjay Dutt) driving a luxurious Mercedes Benz, and try to find out the secret behind his success. Upon investigating, they find that he is living off his 'wife's' wealth.

They then blackmail him into making them his business partners, but little do the four friends know that Kabir, his girlfriend Kamini (Mallika Sherawat) along with his sister Kiya (Kangana Ranaut) have an agenda of their own. Kabir connects them with an investor named Bata Bhai (Satish Kaushik) who is also a don. The four friends convince Bata Bhai to invest his money into Kabir's oil project, and the money is then stolen by Kabir. Kabir leaves the country along with Kamini and Kiya, and leaves the four friends to deal with Bata Bhai. 
However, the four friends are able to leave the city and track Kabir down in Macau. They make a plan to ruin Kabir's happiness and take their money back by going in disguise. 
Roy "cons" Kiya by disguising himself as 'Tukiya' and pretending to be in love with her, whilst Adi disguises himself as a Sikh man called 'Ghanta Singh', getting the job of Kabir's "personal assistant". Roy also disguises himself as 'Heera Bhai', a "Gujarati investor" who would supposedly "invest" in Kabir's casino, and Boman acts as his wife, "in love with Kabir" to break his relationship with Kamini. Manav poses as various characters.

However, Kabir, Kamini, and Kiya find out about their plans and decide to pretend to be fooled by the four friends, playing along with their plans. However, they eventually reveal this at the end when the four friends reveal themselves, shocking and scaring the four friends, who are incensed at getting tricked by the trio again. The movie ends with them escaping from Johnny Bonzela (J. Brandon Hill) due to Kabir exposing them to him.

Cast
 Sanjay Dutt as Kabir Nayak
 Mallika Sherawat as Kamini
 Ritesh Deshmukh as Deshbandhu Roy/Lee/Tukya/Heera Bhai
 Kangana Ranaut as Kiya Nayak
 Arshad Warsi as Aditya "Adi" Shrivastav/Ganta Singh/Milan Supari
 Aashish Chaudhary as Boman Contractor/Dodo/Barbara Hori
 Javed Jaffrey as Manav Shrivastav/Jojo/Moty Bai
 Satish Kaushik as Baba Batanand Swami
 Zakir Hussain as Mohsin Bhai
 J. Brandon Hill as Johnny Bonzela
 Harry Josh as Kasim Kekra
 Farzil Pardiwalla as a Municipality worker
 Vaibhav Mathur as Paan eater, guy in devils bar
 Neeraj Kshetrapal as milkman
 Steven Dasz
 Shahid Hasan as Kabir's office Manager
 Khurshed Lawyer as Kabir's Office
 Michael Lagnusas Alcoholic in Shiny Suit
 Latesh Sharma as Executive

Production

Double Dhamaal which released on 24 June 2011, was shot in Mehboob Studio, Macau and Hong Kong. At the 'Mahurat' of the film, it was announced that Riteish Deshmukh, Aashish Chaudhary, Arshad Warsi and Jaaved Jaaferi will be reprising their roles as friends again, while Sanjay Dutt plays a millionaire this time. The film focused on the four friends blackmailing Dutt to share all his fortune in the most hilarious ways they can think of. The film finished shooting early May 2011, and brought rights to remake the song "Oye Oye" from the 1989 action film, Tridev.

Casting
Earlier, actress Vidya Balan was chosen to play the role of Kamini, but reports suggested she refused and was subsequently replaced by Mallika Sherawat. Asin Thottumkal was offered both the roles of Kamini & Kiya but she didn't sign the film because she could not agree with the script.

Reception

Critical reception
Double Dhamaal received mixed to negative reviews from critics upon release. Review aggregator Rotten Tomatoes gave it a 20% rotten rating.

Top critic Taran Adarsh of Bollywood Hungama awarded the film 4/5 stars, saying that it is "seriously hilarious" and that "sometimes, a good laugh is all you need to make your day. Try not to miss this one, it pledges hilarity in abundance..." Nikhat Kazmi from the Times of India gave the film 3/5 stars and said "This one's definitely not for the fastidious, choosy viewer but for those who don't mind losing it for a bit, Double Dhamaal works like an average Bollywood comedy. Performance-wise, it's one big circus with the guys hogging most of the limelight. The girls -- Mallika and Kangana -- are mere confetti." Mayank Shekhar of the Hindustan Times rated the film with 1 out of 5 stars. Shakti Salgaokar of DNA gave the movie a one and half stars and wrote in his review: "Indra Kumar's recipe for double dhamaal is quite simple – sexual innuendo, potshots at popular films, bad mimicry, foreign locations, a generous dose of overacting, an item song and a gora villain. And as he magnificently presents the climax of the film (which is funny in parts but overall ends up being a damp squib) he leaves you with a threat of a sequel. Spare us the horror, please?." Nikita Kapoor of FilmiTadka rated Double Dhamaal with 2 out of 5 stars and said – "In the end Double Dhamaal is a completely mindless, non-sense comedy, which is a sequel to 2007 film, Dhamaal. If the first one was Dhamaal, then this one was not an iota more than half Dhamaal." Rachel Saltz of The New York Times wrote in her review: "The director, Indra Kumar, lets his baggy tale sprawl to 2 hours and 18 minutes and peppers it with references to other, better films and with movie talk in general. "All characters are fictitious," someone says when the fools are caught scheming on camera, "and bear no resemblance to people living or dead." In this case, all you can say is amen."

Commercial reception
According to Box Office India, the film had a good opening of 60 – 70% collections. At a few multiplexes, such as, Spice Noida, E Square Pune and Wave Ludhiana, the film almost opened at a 100% response. The film collected approximately  76.1 million net on its first day, according to Box Office India. It is the third biggest opener of the year at That time , following Ready and Yamla Pagla Deewana. The film had a strong Saturday, collecting  80.8 million net. The film's weekend collections amounted to  256.5 million net. The movie grossed  700 million worldwide. Box Office India finally declared it a "Average".

Soundtrack

The music of the film was composed by Anand Raj Anand while the lyrics were penned by Mayur Puri and Anand Raj Anand. Music of the film was released on 31 May 2011. The soundtrack features the song "Oye Oye", a remake of the song "Tirchi Topiwale" from the 1989 film Tridev.

The song "Jalebi Bai" was later used by Canandian artist Tesher in his viral single "Jalebi Baby", the hook being incorporated with some lyrics borrowed from Justin Bieber's song "Yummy".

Track listing

Accolades

Release
Double Dhamaal's DVD was released by Reliance Home Video. The television premiere was announced to be broadcast on Zee Cinema.

Distribution rights
Double Dhamaal's distribution rights were sold to Zee Entertainment Enterprises.

Sequel
A sequel, and the third installment in the series, was announced after the release of Double Dhamaal, though the film was slammed by critics, and was a commercial success. Filming started in March 2012 and is set to release on 22 February 2019 under the title of Total Dhamaal. Director Indra Kumar has decided to do away with the female leads and bring back the entire cast from the hit film Dhamaal with one change.

References

External links
 
Double Dhamaal at the Internet Movie Database on Filmfree4u.online
 

Films scored by Anand Raj Anand
2010s Hindi-language films
2010s adventure comedy films
Indian adventure comedy films
2011 films
Films shot in Mauritius
Films shot in Hong Kong
Films directed by Indra Kumar
Indian sequel films
Reliance Entertainment films
2011 comedy films